Goodenia pusilliflora, commonly known as small-flower goodenia, is a species of flowering plant in the family Goodeniaceae and is endemic to drier parts of southern Australia. It is a low-lying to ascending herb with oblong to egg-shaped leaves with toothed or lyrate edges, and racemes of small yellow flowers.

Description

Taxonomy and naming
Goodenia pusilliflora was first formally described in 1888 by Ferdinand von Mueller in The Victorian Naturalist.

In 1990, Roger Charles Carolin selected the specimens collected at the junction of the Murray and Darling Rivers collected by Charlotte Holding as the lectotype. The specific epithet (pusilliflora) means "very small-flowered".

Distribution and habitat
This goodenia grows in a variety of communities where water lies after rain in the drier areas of Western Australia, South Australia, New South Wales and Victoria.

Gallery

References

pusilliflora
Eudicots of Western Australia
Flora of South Australia
Flora of New South Wales
Flora of Victoria (Australia)
Plants described in 1888
Taxa named by Ferdinand von Mueller